Pourrières is a commune in the Var department in the Provence-Alpes-Côte d'Azur region in southeastern France.

Population

Personalities 
It is the home town of the French poet Germain Nouveau.

Jacqueline Eymar, classical pianist born in 1922, died in Pourrières in 2008.

See also
Communes of the Var department

References

Communes of Var (department)